The Rio Grande Hydroelectric Complex is a pumped-storage hydroelectric power station in the Calamuchita Department of Córdoba Province, Argentina. The complex consists of two dams and a power station in the Cerro Pelado Valley. Aside from power generation, the complex also serves to control floods and provide municipal water. The two dams on the Tercero River are the Cerro Pelado Dam which forms the upper reservoir and the Arroyo Corto Dam which forms the lower reservoir. Water from the upper reservoir is sent to the underground power station during periods of high power demand. The power station contains four  reversible Francis turbine-generators. Water from the power station is discharged into the lower reservoir. During periods of lower power demand such as at night, water is pumped with the same turbines back up to the upper reservoir for use in peak hours. Construction on the complex began in 1976 and the generators were commissioned in 1986.

See also

List of power stations in Argentina

References

Dams completed in 1986
Energy infrastructure completed in 1986
Dams in Argentina
Pumped-storage hydroelectric power stations in Argentina
Buildings and structures in Córdoba Province, Argentina
Hydroelectric power stations in Argentina
Underground power stations
1986 establishments in Argentina